The 1970 William & Mary Indians football team represented the College of William & Mary as a member of the Southern Conference (SoCon) during the 1970 NCAA University Division football season. Led by Lou Holtz in his second year as head coach, William & Mary finished the season 5–7 overall and 3–1 in conference play, winning the SoCon title. The Indians were invited to the Tangerine Bowl, where they lost to Toledo.

Schedule

NFL Draft

References

William and Mary
William & Mary Tribe football seasons
Southern Conference football champion seasons
William and Mary Indians football